Earl Schmidt was born November 27, 1929 to Phillip and Emma Schmidt on a dairy farm in Cologne, Minnesota.  He is a polka musician who was inducted into the Minnesota Music Hall of Fame in 2004. Earl began his musical career playing trombone in his high school band at Norwood Young America. He organized a little German Band, playing at school functions and other engagements in the area. The same year he played his first professional job with Ivan Kahle. While in the Marine Corps he was accepted into the United States Marine Band in San Diego and marched in two Rose Parades. In 1960 Schmidt and Jerry Schuft organized the Earl Schmidt Orchestra featuring Jerry Schuft and played ballrooms, on radio and TV and on tours.  In 2003, Earl and Marville were recognized as Volunteers of the Year by the Minnesota Music Hall of Fame. They had worked as emcees for concertina jamborees annually in Gibbon, since 1973. Earl also enjoyed word games and crossword puzzles and was a contestant on two game shows: Scrabble and Wheel of Fortune.  He died on December 11, 2008 at Ridgeview Medical Center in Waconia, Minnesota.

References

 http://www.herald-journal.com/obits/2008/schmidt1219.html
 https://web.archive.org/web/20110822080432/http://mnmusichalloffame.org/uploads/Earl_Schmidt_and_Jerry_Schuft.pdf

1929 births
People from Carver County, Minnesota
2008 deaths
Polka musicians
20th-century American musicians
20th-century American male musicians